ISC may refer to:

Arts and entertainment
 Imperial Space Command, a fictional organization in the books by Catherine Asaro
 Indian Society of Cinematographers, a non-profit cultural and educational organisation
 Intervision Song Contest, an Eastern Bloc version of the Eurovision Song Contest from the 1970s and 1980s

Science and technology
 Induced stem cells
 International Science Council, a non-governmental organization uniting scientific bodies
 International Seismological Centre, a seismology data center
 Intersystem crossing, an excited state dynamic in chemistry and physics
 Iron-sulfur cluster biosynthesis protein family, machinery for producing iron-sulfur clusters

Computing
 Initiative for Software Choice, a group of software vendors
 Interactive Systems Corporation, a defunct Unix vendor
 Internet Storm Center, a program run by the SANS Institute that monitors the level of malicious activity on the Internet
 International Supercomputing Conference, a yearly conference on Supercomputing which has been held in Europe
 Inverse Symbolic Calculator
 Internet Systems Consortium, an organization that develops Internet software
 ISC license, a free software license introduced by the Internet Systems Consortium

Education
 Independent Schools Council, a British organization representing independent schools
 Indian School Certificate, a national level examination for the upper years (Classes XI and XII) of high school
 Institut supérieur du commerce de Paris, a French business school
 International School of Carthage, a private school in Tunis, Tunisia
 International School of Curitiba, a school in Curitiba, Brazil
 International Students' Committee, organizers of the St. Gallen Symposium in Switzerland
 International Student Conference, a nonpartisan rival organization to the International Union of Students
 Islamic World Science Citation Database, Iranian regional citation index

Sports
 International Shooto Commission, an international commission of combat sports called MMA
 International Softball Congress, a North American softball tournament organization
 International Speedway Corporation, former auto racing race track owner; merged with NASCAR in 2019
 ISC (sportswear), an Australian sports apparel manufacturer
 International Sportsworld Communicators, the owner of the commercial rights to the World Rally Championship
 Indonesia Soccer Championship, a football league system in Indonesia
 Indonesia Soccer Championship A, a top-tier league
 Indonesia Soccer Championship B, a second-tier league

Other organizations
 Indigenous Services Canada
 Infiltration Surveillance Center, the defunct command center for Operation Igloo White in Nakhon Phanom, Thailand
 Intelligence and Security Committee, a committee of the UK Parliament
 International Signal and Control, an American defense contractor
 International Socialist Commission
 International Silver Company, a corporation banding together many existing silver companies in Connecticut
 Information Services Corporation, a corporation responsible for the development, management and administration of: registries – land titles, personal property, corporate and survey registries in Saskatchewan
 Kandersteg International Scout Centre, Switzerland

Other uses
 Internet Scrabble Club, an online Scrabble website
 St Mary's Airport, Isles of Scilly (IATA airport code), an airport in the Isles of Scilly
 International service center, a type of United States Postal Service facility

See also
 ICS (disambiguation)
 ISCC (disambiguation)
 (ISC)² (International Information Systems Security Certification Consortium), a non-profit organization headquartered in Palm Harbor, Florida, US
 ISSC (disambiguation)